Eremophila tietkensii is a flowering plant in the figwort family, Scrophulariaceae and is endemic to Australia. It is a rounded to flat-topped shrub with grey-green leaves, usually pinkish-purple sepals and mauve, pink or lilac-coloured petals. It is mostly found in Western Australia but also occurs in the far west of the Northern Territory.

Description

Both surfaces of the sepals are hairy, especially around the edges and are usually more hairy on the outer surface. The petal tube is pale lilac to pale mauve or pink on the outside and white with purple spots inside the tube. The outer surface of the petal tube is slightly hairy but the inner surface of the lobes is glabrous while the inside of the tube is filled with long, woolly hairs. The 4 stamens are fully enclosed in the petal tube.

Taxonomy and naming
Eremophila tietkensii was first formally described by Ferdinand von Mueller and Ralph Tate in 1890 from specimens collected on the 1889 expedition of William Tietkens in the Northern Territory. The description was published in Transactions and proceedings and report, Royal Society of South Australia. In 1928, Alfred James Ewart and Phyllis Heather Jarrett considered it to be a variety of Eremophila latrobei, publishing their report in Proceedings of the Royal Society of Victoria but after examining the original specimens and comparing them with those of E. latrobei, Robert Chinnock reverted to the original name. Chinnock's 2007 explanation was published in Journal of the Adelaide Botanic Garden. The specific epithet (tietkensii) honours the explorer Tietkens.

Distribution and habitat
This eremophila is widespread in Western Australia, occurring in inland areas between the Rawlinson and Barlee ranges, growing on rocky slopes, stony clay flats and undulating plains in the Carnarvon, Central Ranges, Gascoyne, Gibson Desert, Great Sandy Desert, Little Sandy Desert, Murchison and Pilbara biogeographic regions. It also occurs in the far south-west of the Northern Territory.

Use in horticulture
In an ideal situation, E. tietkensii is a compact round shrub with grey-green, leathery leaves, masses of pinkish flowers in early spring and coloured sepals which remain after the petals have fallen. It is difficult to propagate from seeds or cuttings but grafts readily onto Myoporum rootstock. It grows best in well-drained soil in a sunny position and is drought tolerant, needing only the occasional watering during a long dry spell, however it is frost sensitive.

Conservation
This species is classified as "not threatened" by the Western Australian Government Department of Parks and Wildlife.

References

Eudicots of Western Australia
tietkensii
Flora of the Northern Territory
Plants described in 1890
Taxa named by Ferdinand von Mueller
Taxa named by Ralph Tate